The Health Emergency Preparedness and Response Authority (HERA) is a directorate-general of the European Commission created to prepare the EU for a future pandemic and to avoid the mistakes made during the EU's response to the COVID-19 pandemic. European Commission President Ursula von der Leyen first announced plans for such a body in 2020. On 15 September 2021, the EU announced the launch of HERA and the service was established as a directorate-general of the European Commission on 16 September. HERA has been operational since early 2022.

HERA will assess potential health threats, promote research, ensure the availability of critical production and help build stockpiles. During a health crisis, the authority would activate emergency funding and help coordinate monitoring, acquisition and purchase of medical equipment or treatments.

See also 
 Health Threat Unit
 Health Security Committee

References

External links 
 HERA subsection of the European Commission's Website
 Public Health EU Portal the official public health portal of the European Union
 Commission Decision of 16 September 2021 establishing the Health Emergency Preparedness and Response Authority on EUR-Lex
 Proposal for a Council Regulation on a framework of urgent measures related to medical countermeasures in the event of a public health emergency at Union level on EUR-Lex
 Procedure 2021/0294/NLE on EUR-Lex
 Document file COM(2021)0577 on ŒIL
 Proposal for a Regulation of the European Parliament and of the Council on serious cross-border threats to health
 Procedure 2020/0322/COD on EUR-Lex
 Procedure 2020/0322(COD) on ŒIL

2021 establishments in Europe
Government agencies established in 2021
Medical and health organizations based in Europe
Medical research institutes
Government health agencies
Organizations based in Europe
COVID-19 pandemic in Europe
Health and the European Union
Executive agencies of the European Commission
Directorates-General in the European Commission